The UNGG (Uranium Naturel Graphite Gaz) is an obsolete nuclear power reactor design developed in France. It was graphite moderated, cooled by carbon dioxide, and fueled with natural uranium metal. The first generation of French nuclear power stations were UNGGs, as was Vandellos unit 1 in Spain. Of the ten units built, all were shut down by the end of 1994, most for economic reasons due to staffing costs. A UNGG reactor is often simply referred to as an GCR in English documents.

Design 

The UNGG is along with the Magnox the main type of gas cooled reactor (GCR). It was developed independently of and parallel to the British Magnox design, both to meet similar requirements of simultaneous production of electric power and plutonium. Although the French and the British models both used natural uranium and the same moderator and coolant, there were differences in design. In France, each next built reactor had a different design. The first UNGG reactors at Marcoule used horizontal fuel channels and a concrete containment structure. Chinon A1 used vertical fuel channels and a steel pressure-vessel.

The fuel cladding material was a magnesium-zirconium alloy in the UNGG, as opposed to magnesium-aluminium in Magnox. As both claddings react with water, they can be stored in a spent fuel pool only for short periods of time, making short-term reprocessing of fuel essential, which requires heavily shielded facilities.

The programe was a succession of units, with changes to the design increasing power output. In the experimental phase they were built by the Commissariat à l'Énergie Atomique (CEA), and later by Électricité de France (EDF). The largest UNGG reactor built was Bugey 1 with a net electrical output of 540 MW.

Units
 G1, G2 and G3 at Marcoule. G1 was the first UNGG; a prototype for military use. G1 had a net output of 2 MWe and became critical in 1956.
 Chinon Nuclear Power Plant A1, A2, and A3 in Indre-et-Loire.
 Saint-Laurent Nuclear Power Plant A1 and A2 in Loir-et-Cher, operated from 1969 and 1971 to April 1990 and June 1992.
 Reactor 1 at Bugey Nuclear Power Plant in Ain, the last UNGG built in France, first criticality 1972, closed in May 1994.
 Vandellòs Nuclear Power Plant Unit 1 in Spain, the only UNGG built outside France, closed in July 1990.

The earlier units, at Chinon and Marcoule, had heat exchangers outside the main pressure vessel; Later units (Saint-Laurent, Bugey and Vandellos) moved these heat exchangers to inside the pressure vessel.

See also
 Nuclear power in France
 Vandellòs I Nuclear Accident

References 

 French activities on gas cooled reactors, D Bastien, IAEA-TECDOC—899, pp:51-53, 30 Oct - 2 Nov 1995
 Twenty-nine years of French experience in operating gas-cooled reactors, D Bastien, IWGGCR—19, pp:113-119 21-23 Sep 1988 Better copy archived

Graphite moderated reactors
Nuclear power reactor types